Karl Bierschel (March 1, 1932 — November 21, 2019) was a German ice hockey player. He represented Germany in the 1952 Winter Olympics and 1956 Winter Olympics. He played from 1950-62 for Krefelder EV. In 1952 Krefeld won the German Championship, beating SC Riessersee 6-4 in the final at Mannheim. Bierschel played for the German team at the 1952 Oslo and the 1956 Cortina d'Ampezzo Winter Olympics placing eighth and sixth respectively. He was later inducted into the German Ice Hockey Hall of Fame. By profession, he was a butcher with his own business in Krefeld.

References

External links
 

1932 births
2019 deaths
German ice hockey defencemen
Ice hockey players at the 1952 Winter Olympics
Ice hockey players at the 1956 Winter Olympics
Olympic ice hockey players of Germany
Olympic ice hockey players of the United Team of Germany
Sportspeople from Krefeld